The Boeing NLA, or New Large Airplane, was a 1990s concept for an all-new quadjet airliner in the 500+ seat market. Somewhat larger than the 747, this aircraft was similar in concept to the McDonnell Douglas MD-12 and later Airbus A380. In 1993, Boeing chose not to pursue development of this concept, focusing instead on the Boeing 747-500X and -600X, and then on the 747X and 747X Stretch, and subsequently on the Boeing 747-8. The project names for this aircraft were NLA and Boeing 763-246C.

History
The Boeing New Large Airplane was one of several projects started by Boeing in the late 20th century as a way to compete with rival aircraft corporations like Airbus. The Airbus A380 project began to be publicized in 1990 in order to try and turn the commercial aviation market away from the then very prevalent Boeing 747. Boeing sought to combat this and began working up designs for the NLA at some point in the early 1990s, with a scheduled service entry date of before 2000 in order to beat Airbus to the punch.

The goal of the NLA project was to create an airplane capable of traveling primarily long-haul routes and carrying vast amounts of passengers or cargo. At the time of design, twinjet aircraft were not considered suitable for transpacific flights, so the NLA was designed with a four-jet layout (two on each wing), much like the 747 or A380. Long-haul flights such as Sydney to Dubai or London to New York can take anywhere from 8 to 14 hours. The four engines would help provide the power necessary to make these long trips safely. Because the project was designed with the goal of beating competitors based on sheer passenger volume, the NLA was designed with a full-length two deck configuration. This would allow for 600–1000 passengers (depending on airline and class seating configurations), about 50 more passengers than the A380 per configuration.

However, after only a few years of working on the project, Boeing decided that the NLA model was unsustainable with the way the commercial aviation market was trending. Instead of larger, higher capacity aircraft with the ability to make long hub-to-hub routes in a single go, Boeing decided the future was in smaller, more direct flights. As a result, they cancelled the NLA project to focus on 747 expansion models.

Specifications (NLA, as designed)

Source: Seattle Post-Intelligencer

See also

References

Abandoned civil aircraft projects of the United States
NLA
Quadjets